Givenchy-lès-la-Bassée (literally Givenchy near La Bassée) is a commune in the Pas-de-Calais department in the Hauts-de-France region of France.

Geography
The Canal d'Aire flows past the commune, forming its southern border.

History
The village was first chronicled in the year 870 as "Juventiacum".

During the First World War, it was completely destroyed, as this was the only part of the entire front that withheld the force of the German offensive in the spring of 1918. The courageous stand of the 55th (West Lancashire) Division is commemorated by a memorial in the village. For much of the war, the village was an area of fierce underground warfare. In 1916, William Hackett was awarded the Victoria Cross for an action at Givenchy. The Tunnellers Memorial at Givenchy, unveiled on 19 June 2010, commemorates Hackett's action.

During the Second World War, at the time of the withdrawal of British troops towards Dunkirk, the school, mayor's office and the memorial village hall were again destroyed. After the devastation of that war, the citizens of Liverpool donated reading books and money to the town of Givenchy-les-la-Bassee. The town hall of Givenchy has a plaque on the front wall thanking the City of Liverpool for its kindness and support for the town.

In 2008, a small group of students from Liverpool went to Givenchy on behalf of the City of Liverpool on the 90th anniversary of the First World War. Finally, the community of Givenchy still to this day has meetings with Liverpool's Lord Mayor and unity between the two places are still strong

Population

Places of interest
 The Commonwealth War Graves Commission cemetery.
 The Church of St.Martin, built in 1960.
 The War Memorial.

See also
Communes of the Pas-de-Calais department

References

External links

 The CWGC graveyard in the communal cemetery

Givenchyleslabassee